Outer Ring may refer to:
Outer Ring (Munich), a ring road in Germany
Berlin outer ring, a railway line in Germany
 Monoceros Ring, a formation in space

See also
Outer ring road (disambiguation)